Dr Francis Pound (1948 - 15 October 2017)  was a New Zealand art historian, curator and writer.

Works
Pound's writings "challenged the writing of an earlier generation of art historians, including Hamish Keith, Gordon H. Brown and Peter Tomory, and championed abstract artists, especially Gordon Walters and Richard Killeen." Pound completed his doctorate on the work of Richard Killeen and lectured in art history at the University of Auckland. Pound's particular concern was nationalism and New Zealand art. His 1983 book Frames on the Land refuted earlier art historical arguments for a particular quality to New Zealand's light, which resulted in a bold, hard-eged approach to landscape painting in that country. Instead, he argued that visiting and immigrant artists in the 19th century brought established 'frames' with them, such as a sense of the land and a sublime and awesome force, through which they interpreted the New Zealand landscape.

His 1994 book The Space Between: Pakeha Use of Maori Motifs in Modernist New Zealand Art came in the wake of the 1992 exhibition Headlands: Thinking Through New Zealand Art, and discusses the cultural appropriation of Māori art and culture by modern Pākehā New Zealand artists, including Gordon Walters, Colin McCahon and Richard Killeen. Pound's final book summarises his thinking on 1930s artists, writers and thinkers who used art, literature and theory to posit a new sense of New Zealand identity through high culture, and how from the 1970s this framework was dismantled.

Publications

Books by Francis Pound include:
 Frames on the Land : Early Landscape Painting in New Zealand, Auckland: Collins, 1983. 
 Forty modern New Zealand paintings  Auckland: Penguin Books, 1985.  
 Voyage, Auckland: Workshop Press, 1991.  
 Signatures of place : paintings & place-names, New Plymouth: Govett-Brewster Art Gallery, 1991. 
 The space between : Pakeha use of Maori motifs in modernist New Zealand art, Auckland: Workshop Press, 1994.  
 Stories we tell ourselves : the paintings of Richard Killeen, Auckland: Auckland Art Gallery and David Bateman, 1999. 
 Walters : en abyme, Auckland: Gus Fisher Gallery, 2004. 
 The invention of New Zealand : art & national identity, 1930-1970, Auckland: Auckland University Press, 2009.

References

Further reading
 Francis Pound, [The Real & the Unreal In New Zealand Painting: A discussion prompted by a new edition of An Introduction to New Zealand painting], Art New Zealand, no. 25 Summer 1982-83
 Hamish Keith, Review of Frames On The Land, Art New Zealand, no. 28, Spring 1983
 Francis pound, 'Harsh clarities: meteorological and geographical determinism in New Zealand art commentary refuted', Parallax, vol. 1, no. 3, Winter 1983, pp. 263–269
 Peter Simpson, Review of The Invention of New Zealand, New Zealand Herald, 11 December 2009 
 Gavin McLean, Review of The Invention of New Zealand, Otago Daily Times, 20 February 2010
 Hugh Roberts, Review of The Invention of New Zealand, ''New Zealand Books, 1 June 2010
 Linda Tyler's obituary for Radio New Zealand, 21 October 2017

1948 births
New Zealand curators
New Zealand art historians
2017 deaths